Championa elegans is a species of longhorn beetles (insects in the family Cerambycidae). It was described by Chemsak in 1967. It is found in Mexico.

References 

Heteropsini
Beetles described in 1967
Insects of Mexico
Beetles of North America